The Battle of Turtle Gut Inlet (June 29, 1776) was an important, early naval victory for the Continental Navy and the future "Father of the American Navy", Captain John Barry.
It was the first privateer battle of the American Revolutionary War.
The battle resulted in the first American casualty of the war in New Jersey, Lieutenant Richard Wickes, brother of Captain Lambert Wickes.
It was the only Revolutionary War battle fought in Cape May County.

Background

To prevent the Americans from receiving war supplies through the port of Philadelphia, the British Navy established a blockade of the Delaware Bay.  This fleet included over 240 cannons.  The Americans then fortified the river with cheveaux-de-frise in the shipping channel.

To transport gunpowder and arms, Robert Morris of the Pennsylvania Committee of Safety chartered the newly built brig, also called brigantine, Nancy and her captain, Hugh Montgomery on March 1, 1776.

On March 14, 1776, John Barry was commissioned captain of the fourteen-gun  in the Continental Navy.

In early June, the privateer Nancy loaded supplies in the Caribbean islands of St. Thomas and St. Croix. 
She then sailed for Philadelphia with "three hundred and eighty-six barrels of gunpowder, fifty fire-locks, one hundred and one hogsheads of rum, and sixty-two hogsheads of sugar, &c, on board". 
In mid-June, Barry was alerted by Morris that Nancy was headed his way, and would need protection since she had only an eleven-man crew and six cannons.

Barry was soon joined by the eighteen-gun , captained by Lambert Wickes, and the eight-gun , captained by William Hallock, and headed for Cape May.

The British blockade forces were led by the 28-gun , captained by Henry Bellew, and included the 32-gun , captained by Charles Hudson,  and the sixteen-gun , captained by Alexander Graeme.

Also at this time, the vanguard of the British fleet of over one hundred ships was set to enter New York Harbor on the morning of June 29.

Battle
Late on the afternoon of June 28, a lookout on Kingfisher spotted Nancy sailing toward Cape May and began chase, followed by Orpheus.
Nancy, and the pursuing British, were spotted by the American lookout at Cape May.
Captain Barry, on Lexington, received a message by flag code from Nancy that she needed help. Barry in turn signaled Reprisal and Wasp and then met with their captains to plan a response.
Longboats from Lexington, Wasp, and Reprisal, led by Lieutenant Richard Wickes, set out to assist Nancy.

In the early hours of June 29, pursued by the British Orpheus and Kingfisher and blocked from entering the Delaware Bay, Nancy headed for the nearby Turtle Gut Inlet in a heavy fog. She soon ran aground, while the larger British ships were kept to deeper waters.

Although still out of range but sailing closer, the British shelled Nancy, while the Americans attempted to salvage the cargo, especially the gunpowder kegs. Barry organized the crews into two operations. One group returned cannon fire to keep the British from boarding. The other transferred the cargo onto longboats and rowed to shore where local residents helped unload and secure it behind the dunes.

By late in the morning of June 29, 265 to 286 kegs of gunpowder had been removed, and the British bombardment had  heavily damaged Nancy. Barry ordered the main sail wrapped around fifty pounds of gunpowder to create a long fuse running from the nearly 100 gunpowder kegs remaining in the hold to the deck and over the side. The fuse was lit as the crew abandoned ship, while one last sailor climbed the mast to remove the American flag. The British thought the lowering of the flag was a sign of surrender and quickly boarded Nancy. By then the fuse had reached the hold.  The gunpowder exploded with a huge blast felt for miles which killed many British. Captain Graeme reported the loss of his master's mate and six men on longboats from Kingfisher.

Lieutenant Richard Wickes, brother of Captain Lambert Wickes of Reprisal, was killed by British cannon fire near the end of the battle.

Aftermath

The battle demonstrated the resourcefulness of the American forces to the British. As a result, the British Navy moved their blockade of Philadelphia further away from the Cape May area. The heroics of Captain John Barry in salvaging most of the gunpowder cargo and driving off two Royal Navy ships was quickly noted, an important step in his career. Following the battle, Captain Wickes on Reprisal, continued with his mission to the West Indies.

Lieutenant Richard Wickes is buried at the Cold Spring Presbyterian Church cemetery. A section of the cemetery, Veterans Field of Honor, is dedicated to his memory. The Seal of Wildwood Crest and the Seal of the Wildwood Crest Historical Society each contain a drawing of the brigantine Nancy in honor of the battle. In 1922, Cape May County filled in Turtle Gut Inlet.
The site is now remembered by a small park.

Gallery
Wildwood Crest

Cold Spring Presbyterian Church cemetery

See also
History of the United States Marine Corps
Naval battles of the American Revolutionary War

References

Bibliography

External links

 

 Battle of Turtle Gut Inlet

1776 in New Jersey
Cape May County, New Jersey
Conflicts in 1776
Naval battles of the American Revolutionary War
Battles of the American Revolutionary War in New Jersey
United States Marine Corps in the 18th and 19th centuries
Naval battles of the American Revolutionary War involving the United States